"The Subway" is the 30th episode of the sitcom Seinfeld. It is the 13th episode of the show's third season. It aired on January 8, 1992.

The episode was written by Larry Charles and was directed by Tom Cherones.

Plot
Each of the four principal characters has a unique experience during a subway ride: 

Jerry befriends an overweight nudist (Ernie Sabella) on his ride to Coney Island to pick up his found car (The Alternate Side). 

George meets an enchanting woman passenger (Barbara Stock) who seduces him, takes him to her hotel bedroom, handcuffs him to a bed while he is in his underwear, and robs him. He misses his job interview due to the delay and has to walk all the way across the city in a bed sheet to get his spare key from Jerry. 

Kramer overhears a horse racing tip from another passenger, places a $600, 30-to-1 bet at an off-track betting parlor, and wins $18,000 in cash, helping to pay for his numerous traffic violations (including "no doors"). On the way back, Kramer is attacked by another bettor for the money, only to be saved by a cop posing as a blind violinist who plays on trains. Kramer ends up paying for his, Jerry and Elaine's meal at Monk's.

Elaine misses a lesbian wedding she was to attend due to train delays, which made her feel claustrophobic and incredibly frustrated.

Reception
In 2012, Paste Magazine named "The Subway" the 16th best episode of the series, citing it as a "great example of how Seinfeld can turn something as everyday and mundane as riding the subway into not one, but four hilarious stories. In 2013, NYC & Company, New York City's official tourism organization, named it the "New Yorkiest" episode of the series.

References

External links 
 

1992 American television episodes
Seinfeld (season 3) episodes
Works set on the New York City Subway